Lamar Holmes (born July 8, 1989) is a former Canadian football offensive tackle. He was drafted by the Atlanta Falcons in the third round of the 2012 NFL Draft. Holmes played college football at Southern Miss. He is from Gastonia, North Carolina and attended Hunter Huss High School.

Professional career

Atlanta Falcons
Holmes was selected by the Atlanta Falcons in the third round (91st pick overall) of the 2012 NFL Draft. On September 8, 2013, Holmes played his first career start at right tackle against the New Orleans Saints. Holmes played in all 16 games with 15 starts seeing time at both right and left tackle. Holmes blocked for an offense that averaged 343.1 total yards per game in 2013, including 283.8 passing yards per game, which was the second-highest average in club history. Holmes started at right tackle and blocked for an offense that set a franchise record for total yards with 568 yards against the New Orleans Saints on September 7, 2014. Holmes started and helped block for an offense that scored 56 points (2nd most in team history) and recorded 488 total yards against the Tampa Bay Buccaneers on September 18, 2014. On December 5, 2015 Holmes was released with an injury settlement.

Detroit Lions
On February 12, 2016, Holmes signed with the Detroit Lions. On May 13, 2016, the Lions released Holmes.

References

External links
 
 Atlanta Falcons bio
 Southern Miss Golden Eagles bio

1989 births
Living people
American football offensive tackles
Canadian football offensive linemen
American players of Canadian football
Atlanta Falcons players
Itawamba Indians football players
People from Gastonia, North Carolina
Players of American football from North Carolina
Southern Miss Golden Eagles football players
Hamilton Tiger-Cats players